George Loring Brown  (February 2, 1814 – June 25, 1889) was an American landscape painter.  He was born in Boston and first studied wood engraving under Alonzo Hartwell and worked as an illustrator.  He studied painting with Washington Allston, but soon went to Europe, residing principally in Italy for years.  Brown spent much of his life abroad, and the motives of his pictures are usually Italian, and there is nothing specifically American about them either in treatment or sentiment.  Among the best are Sunset in Genoa (1875), Doges' Palace and Grand Canal, Bay of Naples, Niagara Falls in Moonlight. The Bay of New York (1869) was acquired by King Edward VII when visiting America as Prince of Wales.

Further reading
 Catalogue of oil paintings, water color drawings by George L. Brown ...: Now on exhibition by Doll & Richards, to be sold by auction ... May 7, 8, 9, and 10. Boston: Doll & Richards, 1879.
 Samuel Greene Wheeler Benjamin. Our American artists. Boston: D. Lothrop & Co., 1879.

Image gallery

External links

 WorldCat
 Museum of Fine Arts, Boston has works by Brown
American paintings & historical prints from the Middendorf collection, an exhibition catalog from The Metropolitan Museum of Art (fully available online as PDF), which contains material on Brown (no. 22)

Sources
 Oxford Gallery

Artists from Boston
People from Malden, Massachusetts
19th-century American painters
American male painters
American landscape painters
1814 births
1889 deaths
19th-century American male artists